Gideon the Ninth is a 2019 science fantasy novel by the New Zealand writer Tamsyn Muir. It is Muir's debut novel and the first in her Locked Tomb series, followed by  Harrow the Ninth (2020), Nona the Ninth (2022), and Alecto the Ninth (2023).

Plot
In the star system Dominicus, there are nine planets, each home to a great House which practices its own school of necromancy. The Houses in turn are ruled by the Emperor, an impossibly powerful, immortal necromancer whom they have worshipped as a god for the past ten thousand years. At the start of Gideon the Ninth, the Emperor invites the heirs of the Nine Houses and their sword-wielding bodyguards (called cavaliers) to undergo a series of trials to become Lyctors. Lyctors are immortal necromancers, revered as saints, who serve as the Emperor's right-hand necromancers in wars against his enemies.

The narrative begins with eighteen year-old Gideon Nav's 86th attempt to escape the Ninth House, a death cult tasked with guarding a Locked Tomb said to contain the Emperor's greatest foe, and by whom Gideon was raised in indentured servitude. Her plans of fleeing to join the Emperor's armies (called the Cohort) are quickly foiled by her lifelong antagonist and heiress of the Ninth House, Harrowhark "Harrow" Nonagesimus. 

Despite their clashing personalities and mutual hatred of each other, Gideon is Harrow's only real choice of cavalier, primarily due to an atmospheric contamination incident around the time of their births that killed the rest of the Ninth House's children. Harrow offers Gideon a commission into the Cohort if she serves as cavalier during the Emperor's trials.

Harrow and Gideon travel to Canaan House, a decaying mansion on the planet of the First House, where they meet the heirs and cavaliers of the other Houses. The group is tasked with exploring the mansion to discover the secrets of Lyctorhood.

Harrow initially treats Gideon as a liability and disappears for long periods of time to work on her own, leaving Gideon to wander Canaan House and interact with the other Houses. After one such prolonged absence, Gideon goes looking for her, and with the help of the Sixth House finds her in a hidden basement containing a plethora of necromantic experiments left by the Emperor and his original group of Lyctors. It becomes apparent that each House's necromancer and cavalier must work together to complete the puzzles in the basement, so Harrow and Gideon begrudgingly ally. They make quick progress in the trial due to Harrow's exceptional skill in necromancy and Gideon's perceptiveness and combat skills.

Following a series of suspicious deaths, the Houses assume that one or more of them are hunting the others. It becomes clear that Canaan House is designed to prevent any one of the Nine Houses from succeeding without collaborating with or combating each other. The surviving Houses turn to bribery, blackmail, and unsteady alliances. 

Gideon and Harrow's own relationship reaches a low point over Gideon's infatuation with the terminally ill heiress of the Seventh House, Dulcinea Septimus; tensions run high after Gideon discovers the severed head of the Seventh House cavalier among Harrow's things. Gideon takes her suspicions (and the head) to the Sixth House, who in turn confront Dulcinea. Dulcinea explains that the Emperor's call had "caught out" her House; lacking options, she had been using necromancy to move her cavalier's body about like a puppet's since before their arrival at Caanan House.

Harrow and Gideon reconcile. Harrow reveals that the atmospheric contamination incident was an intentional human sacrifice by her family in order to create a necromancer powerful enough to save the Ninth House from economic and political failure: herself. (An infant Gideon somehow survived the sacrifice, leading Harrow's parents and the rest of the Ninth House to treat her coldly out of fear.) Harrow is haunted by the hundreds of innocent deaths involved in her creation. Her guilt led her to breach the Locked Tomb as a young girl, where she fell in love with the immaculate corpse of the beautiful girl entombed within. Harrow's family died by suicide upon discovering her heretical trespass; Harrow has been burdened with secretly leading the Ninth House for years. Gideon and Harrow apologize for their treatment of each other. Harrow acknowledges Gideon as her friend, and they pledge a new alliance: "One flesh, one end."

The Sixth and the Ninth houses investigate one of the studies in Canaan House. At the same time, the Second House attempts to call the Cohort for backup and intervention, but the Second necromancer is mortally wounded and her cavalier killed by the priests of the First House in the attempt. Meanwhile, the Third House's heiress, Ianthe Tridentarius, deduces how Lyctors are created: a necromancer must extract and devour their cavalier's soul, allowing them to use the soul as a virtually infinite power source and gaining the cavalier's combat skills. Ianthe kills her cavalier without hesitation and becomes a Lyctor, much to the horror of the other Houses. The Eighth House attempts to bring her to justice for the murder of her cavalier, but they are killed when Colum the Eighth is possessed by an angry ghost, who in turn kills his necromancer.

After a brief confrontation with Palamedes the Sixth, the Seventh House heiress reveals herself to be an imposter: not Dulcinea the Seventh, but Cytherea the First, one of the Emperor's Lyctors. Cytherea explains that she killed the real Dulcinea and her cavalier shortly before arriving at Canaan House and assumed her identity; likewise, she was the one who killed the Fourth and Fifth Houses, in the hopes that doing so would lure the Emperor back to Canaan House. She intends to "kill [him] and burn his Houses" as part of a revenge plot, starting with the remaining heirs and cavaliers.

The survivors battle throughout the House, but Cytherea is apparently invincible. Just as Harrow is about to be killed, Gideon dies by suicide to force Harrow to become a Lyctor. Harrow kills Cytherea before falling unconscious.

Harrow wakes up on the Emperor's flagship; she and a wounded Ianthe are the only confirmed survivors of Canaan House. She begs the Emperor to resurrect Gideon, only to learn that Gideon's soul is irreversibly merged with hers. The Emperor reveals that the Empire is in decline and most of the Lyctors have fallen in battle or gone insane. He promises to restore the Ninth House to glory, and in exchange Harrow agrees to serve the Emperor as Harrowhark the First.

Style 

Gideon the Ninth is notable for its writing, which mixes gothic horror with contemporary humor. Muir acknowledges that her writing "includes useless memes and jokes for the reader that nobody in my universe would get." In her review for Vox, Constance Grady commended Muir's ability to slide her "voice seamlessly from Lovecraftian gothic mode into a slangy contemporary mode without ever undercutting one or the other for cheap comedy." Adam Rowe in Forbes also commented on Muir's incorporation of "2019 language tics." In Rowe's interview with Muir, Muir said that the "irreverent tone" was intended "to balance out the horror aspect and some of the heavier, more Gormenghastian stylings." Jason Sheehan's NPR review  said of the novel's genre: "Gideon the Ninth is too funny to be horror, too gooey to be science fiction, has too many spaceships and autodoors to be fantasy, and has far more bloody dismemberings than your average parlor romance." 

Muir consulted with writer, HEMA martial artist and fencer Lissa Harris on realistic depictions of swordfighting and combat. The collaboration is reflected in Gideon's journey retraining from a soldier's longsword to a duelist's rapier; Harris herself transitioned from fencing to the longsword. Harris said that Gideon is a "fiendishly talented fighter who is forced to use new and unfamiliar tools, and has to sacrifice some measure of subtlety in favor of crude effectiveness."

Reception 
Gideon the Ninth was named one of the best books of 2019 by several publications and organizations, including NPR, Vox, the New York Public Library, Wired, Polygon, Bustle, Paste, Shelf Awareness, Book Riot, and Gizmodo Australia, and was selected by Amazon's editors as the best science fiction and fantasy book of 2019. It has received endorsements from authors V. E. Schwab, Charles Stross, Robin Sloan, Warren Ellis, Martha Wells, Amal El-Mohtar, Kiersten White, Annalee Newitz, Genevieve Cogman, Kameron Hurley, Django Wexler, Yoon Ha Lee, Rebecca Roanhorse, Richard Kadrey, Rin Chupeco, Max Gladstone, and Brooke Bolander.

Writing in The New York Times, El-Mohtar called Gideon the Ninth a "devastating debut that deserves every ounce of hype it’s received" and praised it as "deft, tense and atmospheric, compellingly immersive and wildly original."

Liz Bourke and Carolyn Cushman gave a more critical review in Locus, saying that the novel failed "in its interrogation of the central hate-co-dependence-need relationship between Gideon and Harrow." Despite this, Gideon the Ninth won the 2020 Locus Award for Best First Novel.

The novel was also shortlisted for the 2020 Nebula Award for Best Novel, the 2020 World Fantasy Award, and the 2020 Hugo Award for Best Novel.

In 2021, NPR listed Gideon the Ninth and the Locked Tomb series as one of the 50 best science fiction and fantasy books of the 2010s.

References 

2019 debut novels
2019 LGBT-related literary works
21st-century New Zealand novels
Science fantasy novels
2019 science fiction novels
LGBT speculative fiction novels
2010s LGBT novels
New Zealand LGBT novels